Joseph Adam Swash is an English actor and television presenter, best known for his role of Mickey Miller in the BBC One soap opera EastEnders and various presenting roles with ITV2. He won the eighth series of I'm a Celebrity...Get Me Out of Here! in 2008 and the twelfth series of Dancing on Ice in 2020.

Early life and education
Swash studied at Highbury Grove School in Islington, and attended Anna Scher Theatre School.

Career

Early work
When Swash was seven, he made his first television appearance in an Andrex advertisement. In 1991 when he was 9 years old he played the role of a little boy pretending to be an orphan in You Rang M'Lord? then when he was eleven he was cast in the film The Adventures of Pinocchio, as The Fighting boy with Dawn French and Griff Rhys Jones and co-starring Jonathan Taylor Thomas, Richard Claxton and Correy Carrier. His character, known as Fighting Boy because he scuffled with Lampwick over a gun, was turned into a donkey after going on a Roller Coaster. He made minor appearances in several television series such as Casualty, The South Bank Show, The Bill, "Soldier Soldier" and Nickelodeon's LOL: Laugh Out Loud. In 2002, Joe Swash appeared as a participant in the ITV documentary Club Reps.

EastEnders

Swash was about to give up on the idea of becoming an actor when he gained a role in BBC One soap opera EastEnders. He was cast as Mickey Miller and made his first appearance in EastEnders in April 2003 as a recurring character. Owing to a positive viewer reception, producer Louise Berridge turned Mickey into a regular character, and his on-screen family arrived a year later, including Mickey's little sister Demi, played by Swash's real sister, Shana. His son, Harry Swash, also appeared in the soap as his niece Summer Swann for a minimal period. On 26 February 2008, it was announced that Joe Swash, along with the actor who plays his stepfather, David Spinx, were being written out of EastEnders in a "big explosive storyline". He made his final appearance in July 2008. Since the announcement of his departure, Swash has been critical of the direction producers took with his character. He has blamed his three-month screen absence in 2005 on Mickey becoming little more than "light-relief".

However, he has expressed an interest in returning. He later reprised his role of Mickey Miller for two episodes on 19 and 20 September 2011, in order to coincide with his on screen brother's departure from the soap.

I'm a Celebrity...Get Me Out of Here!

In November 2008, Swash entered the Australian jungle to appear in the eighth series of the British reality show I'm a Celebrity...Get Me Out of Here!, which he went on to win.

From 2009 onwards, Swash has been part of the presenting team on the spin-off series I'm a Celebrity...Get Me Out of Here, NOW!. He co-presented the show with Caroline Flack (2009–2010), Russell Kane (2009–2011), Laura Whitmore (2011–2015), Rob Beckett (2012–2014) and David Morgan (2015).

In 2016, the show was renamed I'm a Celebrity: Extra Camp. Swash has co-presented this show with Vicky Pattison (2016), Stacey Solomon (2016), Chris Ramsey (2016), Joel Dommett (2017–2018) and Scarlett Moffatt (2017–2018). On 20 July 2019, it was confirmed that Swash had left the show and would not return for the series that year.

Dancing on Ice
In January 2020, Swash appeared as a contestant on the twelfth series of Dancing on Ice. Swash was partnered with Alexandra Schauman from week 1 until she sustained an injury in week 3. He was re-partnered with Alex Murphy in week 4. Swash and Murphy went on to win the series, beating Perri Kiely and his partner Vanessa Bauer.

Other television appearances
In 2009, Swash, along with ex-rugby player Austin Healey, appeared in the second series of Hole in the Wall, as a team captain.

In 2010, he was a team captain on What Do Kids Know?  with Rufus Hound and Sara Cox on Watch.

In 2011, Swash presented the children's show Gimme A Break on the CBBC Channel. In 2011, Swash and Caroline Flack worked on ITV2 game show Minute to Win It as team captains. In November 2011 Driving Academy aired on the CBBC Channel, with Swash as presenter/narrator. In 2014, a brand new series was aired with celebrities taking part called Celebrity Driving Academy.

In 2013 and 2014, Swash was a regular team captain on ITV2 panel show Fake Reaction. In 2016, he joined the line-up on The Jump as a contestant.

In 2021, Swash appeared on the cooking show Celebrity Masterchef,  when he made the final 3.

Theatre
Swash subsequently performed as Buttons in the pantomime Cinderella, at the Central Theatre in Chatham, Medway.

In 2009 and 2010, he appeared in the pantomime 'Snow White and the Seven Dwarfs' in Bristol.

Other work
In February 2009, Swash and TV presenter Tim Vincent broke a Guinness World Record for throwing the most pancakes to a partner as part of a challenge on Channel 4's The Paul O'Grady Show.

Personal life
Swash was forced to take a three-month break from EastEnders in 2005 after he contracted meningoencephalitis.

On 16 June 2007, Swash's fiancée, Emma Sophocleous, gave birth to their first child, a boy. On 19 January 2008, it was announced the couple had separated. On 3 November 2009, Swash was declared bankrupt by London's High Court after failing to pay a £20,000 tax bill. Swash's agent Becca Barr said it was a mix-up and the actor was not in financial difficulty.

Swash started dating Stacey Solomon in January 2016, after meeting on I'm a Celebrity several years previously. In 2019, the two announced that they were expecting their first child together, joining their family of Swash's son and Solomon's two sons. In May 2019, Solomon gave birth to their first child together, a boy named Rex.

Swash and Solomon got engaged on 24 December 2020, after being together for five years. In July 2021 the pair announced they were expecting a baby girl. On 5 October 2021 Stacey announced on Instagram that the baby, Rose, had been born. On 24 July 2022 they were married in a small ceremony held at their home, Pickle Cottage, in Essex.

On 28 December 2022, Solomon announced she was eight months pregnant with her fifth child and third with Swash.

Filmography

Film

Television
London's Burning (2000) Episode 16, series 12
EastEnders (2003–2008, 2011) – Mickey Miller
I'm a Celebrity...Get Me Out of Here! (2008) – Contestant
Gimme a Break (2008–2011) – Co-presenter
Hole in the Wall (2009) – Team captain
I'm a Celebrity: Extra Camp (2009–2018) – Co-presenter
What Do Kids Know? (2010) – Team captain
Minute to Win It (2011) – Team captain
Driving Academy (2011–2014) – Presenter/narrator
Fake Reaction (2013–2014) – Team captain
The Jump (2016) – Contestant
Dancing on Ice (2020) – Winner
Thomas & Friends (2020–2021) - Sonny (voice)
Joe Swash: Teens In Care (TBA) - Himself/presenter

Guest appearances
The Weakest Link (2006, 2008) – Contestant
All Star Family Fortunes (8 November 2008) – Contestant
The Graham Norton Show (December 2008) – Guest
The Sunday Night Project (11 January 2009) – Guest 
Celebrity Juice (2009, 2010, 2011, 2012, 2014) – Panellist
Total Wipeout (26 December 2009) – Contestant
The Cube: Celebrity Special (18 December 2010) – Contestant
Let's Dance for Comic Relief (5 March 2011) – Participant, with Caroline Flack
The Real Hustle (October 2011) – Guest appearance
The Magicians (12 February 2012) – Guest
Mad Mad World (28 July 2012) – Panellist
Take Me Out: Christmas Special (15 December 2013) – Himself, contestant
Tipping Point: Lucky Stars (5 July 2014) – Contestant
Through the Keyhole (6 October 2014) – Guest panellist
Celebrity Dinner Date (8 October 2014) – Himself, contestant
Keep It in the Family (30 November 2014) – Guest
The Dog Ate My Homework (23 January 2015, 19 February 2016) - Panelist
Reality Bites (19 February 2015) – Guest panellist
Big Star's Little Star (4 March 2015) – Contestant
Celebrity Benchmark (2015) – 'Benchmarker'
The Chase: Celebrity Special (24 October 2015) – Contestant
Pointless Celebrities (23 January 2016 and 22 January 2022) – Contestant
The Crystal Maze (13 July 2017) - Contestant
Tipping Point: Lucky Stars Christmas Special  (24 December 2020) - Contestant
Would I Lie to You?  Season 14 Episode 1 Christmas Special (24 December 2020) - Panellist

Books

References

External links

Joe Swash profile from Biogs.com

Living people
Alumni of the Anna Scher Theatre School
English male soap opera actors
I'm a Celebrity...Get Me Out of Here! (British TV series) winners
MasterChef
People from Islington (district)
Year of birth missing (living people)